The Malko Competition is an international competition for young conductors. It is held by the Danish Radio Symphony Orchestra, to commemorate its founding conductor, Nicolai Malko.

Recipients

Notes

References

External links

Awards established in 1965
Conducting competitions
International music awards